Armaan may refer to:

Armaan is a Hindu boy name. The name originates from the Persian word meaning Hope.

Films
 Armaan (1942 film), a film directed by Kidar Nath Sharma
 Armaan (1953 film), a 1953 Bollywood film
 Armaan (1966 film), a Pakistani film starring Waheed Murad
 Armaan (1981 film), a Hindi film starring Raj Babbar and Shammi Kapoor
 Armaan (2003 film), a Hindi film starring Amitabh Bachchan, Anil Kapoor, Preity Zinta and Gracy Singh
 Armaan (2013 film), a Pakistani film starring Fawad Khan and Aamina Sheikh
 Armaan (2017 film), a Gujarati film starring Poojan Trivedi, Alisha Parjapati, Netri Trivedi

People with the given name
 Armaan Ebrahim (born 1989), Indian car racer
 Armaan Jaffer (born 1997), Indian cricketer
 Armaan Jain (born 1990), Indian actor
 Armaan Khan (born 1980), Pakistani cricketer
 Armaan Kohli (born 1972), Indian actor
 Armaan Malik (born 1995), Indian singer 
 Armaan Verma, Indian film child actor